The economy of Monaco is reliant on tourism and banking. Monaco, situated on the French coast of the Mediterranean Sea, is a popular resort, attracting tourists to its casino and pleasant climate.

The Principality has successfully sought to diversify into services and small, high-value-added, nonpolluting industries. The state has no income tax and low business taxes and thrives as a tax haven both for individuals who have established residence and for foreign companies that have set up businesses and offices. The state retains monopolies in a number of sectors, including tobacco, the telephone network, and the postal service.

Background
Economic development was spurred in the late 19th century with the opening of the rail link to France and a casino. Monaco's economy is now primarily geared toward finance, commerce, and tourism.

Modern times
Low taxes have drawn many foreign companies to Monaco and account for around 75% of the $5.748  billion annual GDP income in (2011). Similarly, tourism accounts for close to 15% of the annual revenue, as the Principality of Monaco also has been a major center for tourism ever since the famed Monte Carlo Casino was established in 1856. The casino is alluded to in the ABBA song Money, Money, Money.

Financial and insurance activities, along with scientific and technical activities are main contributors to GDP of Monaco. Banking sector of Monaco is rather large: in 2015 consolidated banking assets 8.42 times exceeded the country's GDP. Banks operating in Monaco traditionally specialize in private banking, asset and wealth management services.

An economic and customs union with France governs customs, postal services, telecommunications, and banking in Monaco. Before the euro, Monaco used the Monegasque franc, which itself was pegged to the French franc. Now part of the Eurozone, but not the EU, Monaco mints its own euro coins.

All residents pay tax in the form of 19.6% value-added tax on all goods and services.

Monaco is noted for its activity in the field of marine sciences. Its Oceanographic Museum, formerly directed by Jacques-Yves Cousteau, is one of the most renowned institutions of its kind in the world. Monaco import and exports products and services from all over the world. There is no commercial agriculture in Monaco; it is 100% urban.

Tax haven
Monaco levies no income tax on individuals. The absence of a personal income tax in the principality has attracted to it a considerable number of wealthy "tax refugee" residents from European countries who derive the majority of their income from activity outside Monaco; celebrities such as Formula One drivers attract most of the attention, but the vast majority of them are less well-known business people.

In 2000, a report by the French parliamentarians, Arnaud Montebourg and Vincent Peillon, alleged that Monaco had lax policies with respect to money laundering, including within its famed casino, and that the government of Monaco had been placing political pressure on the judiciary so that alleged crimes were not properly investigated.

In 1998, the Organisation for Economic Co-operation and Development (OECD) issued a first report on the consequences of the tax havens' financial systems. Monaco did not appear in the list of these territories until 2004, when OECD became indignant regarding the Monegasque situation and denounced it in its last report, as well as Andorra, Liechtenstein, Liberia and the Marshall Islands, underlining its lack of co-operation as regards to financial information disclosure and availability.

In 2000, the Financial Action Task Force on Money Laundering (FATF) stated: "The anti-money laundering system in Monaco is comprehensive. However, difficulties have been encountered with Monaco by countries in international investigations on serious crimes that appear to be linked also with tax matters. In addition, the FIU of Monaco (SICCFIN) suffers a great lack of adequate resources. The authorities of Monaco have stated that they will provide additional resources to SICCFIN." The Principality is no longer blamed in the 2005 FATF report, as well as all other territories. However, since 2003, the International Monetary Fund (IMF) has identified Monaco, along with 36 other territories, as a tax haven.

The Council of Europe also decided to issue reports naming tax havens. Twenty-two territories, including Monaco, were thus evaluated between 1998 and 2000 on a first round. Monaco is the only territory that refuses to perform the second round, initially forecast between 2001 and 2003, whereas the 21 other territories are implementing the third and last round, planned between 2005 and 2007.

See also
Department of Finance and Economy (Monaco)
Economy of Europe

Notes

External links
 Guardian article on tax havens, discussion of Monaco
 CIA World Factbook entry on Monaco
  Tax system of Monaco

 
Monaco